Fawcett River is a stream in Alberta, Canada.

Fawcett River has the name of S. D. Fawcett, a government surveyor.

See also
List of rivers of Alberta

References

Rivers of Alberta